Isharwal  is a village in Kapurthala district of Punjab State, India. The village is administrated by a Sarpanch, who is an elected representative.

Demography 
According to the report published by Census India in 2011, Isharwal has total number of 284 houses and population of 1,537 of which include 797 males and 740 females. Literacy rate of Isharwal is 74.14%, lower than state average of 75.84%.  The population of children under the age of 6 years is 137 which is 8.91% of total population of Isharwal, and child sex ratio is approximately  1076, higher than state average of 846.

Population data

Air travel connectivity 
The closest airport to the village is Sri Guru Ram Dass Jee International Airport.

Villages in Kapurthala

References

External links
  Villages in Kapurthala
 Kapurthala Villages List

Villages in Kapurthala district